is a city in Aichi Prefecture, Japan. , the city had an estimated population of 80,063 in 32,800 households, and a population density of 1,407 persons per km2.

Geography

Gamagōri is situated on the coast of Mikawa Bay on the Pacific Ocean in southeastern Aichi Prefecture. Sheltered by Chita Peninsula and Atsumi Peninsula, the climate is mild, and parts of the city is within the borders of the Mikawa Wan Quasi-National Park.

Climate
The city has a climate characterized by hot and humid summers, and relatively mild winters (Köppen climate classification Cfa).

Demographics
Per Japanese census data, the population of Gamagōri has been relatively steady over the past 30 years.

Neighboring municipalities
Aichi Prefecture
Okazaki
Toyokawa
Kōta
Nishio

History

Ancient history
Records of place names in present-day Gamagōri have been found from the Nara period.

The area was divided into several shōen during the Heian period, largely under the control of the Udono clan.

Early modern period
During the Edo period, most of the area was tenryō territory ruled directly by the Tokugawa shogunate through hatamoto administrators, with portions controlled by Yoshida Domain  and Okazaki Domain.

Late modern period
After the start of the Meiji period, Gamagōri Village in Hoi District, Aichi Prefecture was proclaimed on October 1, 1889. Gamagōri  was elevated to town status on October 6, 1891.

The area of the town expanded through annexation of the neighboring villages of Toyooka, Kaminogo and Shizusato on July 4, 1906.

The town escaped damage in World War II, but the 1945 Mikawa earthquake caused considerable damage to parts of Gamagōri.

Contemporary history
The city of Gamagōri was proclaimed on April 1, 1954, when the town of Gamagōri merged with the neighboring town of Miya and village of Shiotsu.

The village of Otsuka joined Gamagōri on October 1, 1956, followed by Katahara on April 1, 1962, and Nishiura on April 1, 1963.

Government

Gamagōri has a mayor-council form of government with a directly elected mayor and a unicameral city legislature of 20 members. The city contributes one member to the Aichi Prefectural Assembly.  In terms of national politics, the city is part of Aichi District 14 of the lower house of the Diet of Japan.

Economy
Gamagōri is a regional commercial center and fishing port, with a mixed economy of light manufacturing and agriculture. Gamagōri is also noted for its production of hothouse oranges. Companies headquartered in the city include:
Nidek Co., Ltd., optics
Japan Tissue Engineering Co., Ltd., bio-pharmaceticals
Takemoto Oil & Fat Co. Ltd., edible oils
Gamasa Food Co. Ltd., food processing
Nippon Tokushu Goukin Co.,Ltd., metal fittings and components

Education

University
Aichi University of Technology

Junior college
Aichi University of Technology Automotive Junior College

Schools
Gamagōri has 13 public elementary schools and seven public middle schools operated by the city government and two public high schools operated by the Aichi Prefectural Board of Education. There is also one private high school.

Transportation

Railways

Conventional lines
Central Japan Railway Company
Tōkaidō Main Line：-  -  -  -  -
Meitetsu
Meitetsu Gamagōri Line：-  -  -  -  -

Roads

Expressways
Tōmei Expressway

Japan National Route

External relations

Twin towns – Sister cities

National
Urasoe（Okinawa Prefecture Kyushu Region）
since November 4, 1981

Sister port

International
Gisborne（New Zealand Gisborne Region）
since July 27, 1996

Local attractions
As part of Mikawa Wan Quasi-National Park with numerous scenic offshore islands, Gamagōri is noted for marine sports. There are also several hot spring resorts within the city limits. The Gamagōri Matsuri, held in late July features a fireworks display, and the local festival of former Miya village held in October features an event where mikoshi are carried into the sea. The city is also home to the Lagunasia amusement park and Spa Nishiura Motor Park racetrack.

The small fishing community of Nishiura is noted for its onsen (hot spring resorts), some of which are located near its beach front. The area is famous for the medicinal properties of its water and a number of hotels have sprung up to accommodate the tourists visiting these spas.

Notable people from Gamagōri 

Suzuki Mosaburō, politician
Keiichiro Hirano, Akutagawa-prize winning novelist
Tamanoumi Masahiro, sumo wrestler
Sakae Ōba, Captain of 18th Infantry Regiment
Kodai Senga, Ace Pitcher of Fukuoka SoftBank Hawks and Japan National Baseball Team

References

External links 

  
 

Cities in Aichi Prefecture
Port settlements in Japan
Populated coastal places in Japan
Gamagōri, Aichi